Rag & Bone is an American fashion label helmed by Marcus Wainwright, originally from Britain. The brand is sold in more than 700 shops around the world, as well as in Rag & Bone retail stores.

History
Rag & Bone was founded in 2002 by Nathan Bogle and Marcus Wainwright. In 2004 the label launched with a men's line and a women's line followed in 2005. In 2006, Bogle left the company and David Neville, who joined the company in 2005, became partner with Wainwright. With the help of footwear designer Tull Price, former owner of Royal Elastics and current co-owner of FEIT, Rag & Bone Footwear was founded in 2008.

Created in Spring 2011 for Rag & Bone /JEAN, the D.I.Y. Project sought to flip the traditional photo shoot on its head. An ongoing creative initiative, each girl is given a digital camera, a bag of clothes and the same remit – to interpret Rag & Bone /JEAN in their own individual way. Models such as Miranda Kerr, Jessica Hart, Lily Aldridge, Poppy Delevingne, Abbey Lee Kershaw and Candice Swanepoel have been a part of this.

It was in New York in 2001 that Wainwright had the idea to try to make a pair of men's jeans which ultimately took him to Kentucky where he worked with a factory for over 18 months to perfect his product. That experience, he cites, as informing the brand’s philosophy. Today, Rag & Bone offer men's and women's ready to wear, jeans (under rag &  bone/JEAN), footwear and accessories.

Rag & Bone's footwear line includes the Newbury boot.

For their SS15 menswear collection, in lieu of a fashion show, they enlisted friends of the brand, including Jerry Seinfeld, Carmelo Anthony, Camille Rowe and Alex McWatt for a portrait photo series shot by Andreas Laszlo Konrath.

In October 2015, Wainwright and Neville, who previously spoke at the WWD Menswear Summit, were guest speakers at the WWD CEO Summit where they discussed the brand's trajectory and retail footprint, including their newly opened NY concept store, the General Store.

In October 2016, Rag & Bone expanded into the world of fragrance with the launch of a line of eight unisex Eau de Parfums. Scents included Oddity, Amber, Cypress, Rose, Encens, Oud, Bergamot and Neroli.

In October 2016 Rag & Bone also signed its first licensing deal for eyewear with Italian eyewear creator, Safilo Group, beginning in January 2018.

Ad campaigns
Kate Moss starred in the brand's first ever advertising campaign for FW 2012 and also shot their SS 2013 campaign.
American actor Michael Pitt fronted their first men’s campaign for FW 2013 with French actress Léa Seydoux appearing in their women’s campaign.
For SS 2014 they cast actors Emile Hirsch and Stacy Martin.
For FW14 Michael Pitt and Winona Ryder star in their campaign.

The SS15 campaign featured a Rag & Bone film called The Driver, starring Michael Pitt and Astrid Berges-Frisbey. Directed by Pitt, it won the Best Production Award in the Established Talent category at the Milan Fashion Film Festival in September 2015.

The brand had raised controversy after an attempt at shock advertising backfired, when it commissioned an advertisement where the body of a vintage Porsche 911SC, widely considered a work of art by design enthusiasts, was crushed. However the Porsche used in the film was actually a shell of a car that was salvaged from a scrap yard for the shoot.

In February 2016, Rag & Bone launched a serial Photo Project ad campaign. The photographs, shot by Glen Luchford, featured women representing the diversity and breadth of the brand. Later that year, the Men’s Project featured an eclectic cast of men from various artistic backgrounds. The Project featured John Turturro, Mauro Refosco, Honor Titus, Wiz Khalifa, David Alexander Flinn, Harvey Keitel, Mikhail Baryshnikov and Mark Hamill. The imagery was shot by Andreas Laszlo Konrath, and was released throughout 2016 in tandem with the launch of each featured collection in stores.

In December 2019, Rag & Bone commissioned Stephen Shore to photograph the SS 2020 campaign. Shore photographed models Ajani Russell, Chloe Fineman, Dylan Penn, Faith Lynch, India Graham, James Turlington, Olivia Cooke, Pyper America, Paloma Elsesser, and Sean Lyles wearing the collection while riding the New York City Subway.

Awards and honors
In 2006 Neville and Wainwright won the Ecco Domani Fashion Foundation (EDFF) award in the men's category which entailed a $25,000 prize fund to stage a fashion show during NYFW. That same year they were finalists in the Council of Fashion Designers of America's Vogue Fashion Fund. In 2007 they were recipients of the CFDA's Emerging Talent Award. In 2010, Neville and Wainwright won the CFDA/Swarovski Award for Emerging Menswear Talent. In 2013, Rag & Bone received the Breakthrough Award at the Accessories Council Excellence Awards. In 2014, they were nominated for the CFDA Menswear Designer of the Year. In 2015, Neville and Wainwright were honored at Phoenix House’s Fashion Award Dinner. In 2015, Neville and Wainwright were nominated for the CFDA Menswear Designer of the Year award. In 2016, Neville and Wainwright were nominated for the CFDA Menswear Designer of the Year award for the third time.

References

External links
 
 DIY Project

Clothing brands of the United States